Diceromerus is a genus of beetles in the family Carabidae, containing the following species:

 Diceromerus insularis (Tschitscherine, 1899)
 Diceromerus orientalis (Motschulsky, 1859)

References

Pterostichinae